Maduve Mane ( Wedding House) is a 2011 Indian Kannada language film in the romantic comedy genre starring Ganesh and Shradha Arya in the lead roles. The film was directed by Sunil Kumar Singh and produced by H. A. Rahman under the banner J. J. International. The music of the film was composed by Manikanth Kadri.

Cast
 Ganesh as Suraj 
 Shradha Arya as Suma 
 Tabla Nani
 Sharan
 Avinash Narasimharaju
 Spoorti

Plot
Suraj (Ganesh), a funny, talkative, irritating character, bumps into Suma (Shradha Arya) in a train. She is about to marry Dushyantha, an ASP specialising in dealing with terrorists. Throughout the journey on the train, Suraj attempts to woo her and ends up getting invited to her wedding. He continues to woo her till the last minute but she doesn't fall for him. When Dushyantha is about to tie the knot with Suma, he suddenly walks out of the building dragging Suma along, with everyone including Suraj watching. He then orders Suma and Suraj to get into a jeep and not to stop driving at any cost. He tells everyone about an anonymous phone call about bombs being placed in the jeep and in and outside the building. Although, after checking they realize it was just some LEDs planted and not bombs. Meanwhile, Suraj and Suma's jeep runs out of fuel, so they grab hold of an overhead branch and are saved, but are stuck in a forest. Dushyantha demands his crew to track down the anonymous phone caller. Back in the forest, Suraj and Suma start bonding while finding their way back. Twenty four hours pass without a sign of Suma or Suraj. Dushyantha receives calls from the anonymous caller, who is none other than Suraj. Suma catches him red-handed and Dushyantha identifies the caller. Suraj and Suma reach his village where he reveals about his sister Preeti, who was killed by Dushyantha. He also reveals how corrupt and uncivilized Dushyantha is. Dushyantha then arrives at Suraj's home and reveals to him privately about himself, unaware that he is being filmed. Suraj then plays his video at Dushyantha and Suma's wedding, where Suraj had come to save a little girl from this village from Dushyantha. Dushyantha is arrested. Suma, her family, Suraj, and the little girl are at the train station, where the little girl promises to achieve what Preeti was headed to do (she had been selected to be a part of NASA and was going there when she got shot). Just before the movie finishes Suma and Suraj unite.

Production
The film was earlier rumored to be a remake of Hindi blockbuster film Dilwale Dulhania Le Jayenge. However, the team dismissed the rumors and said that the film was an adaptation of Ramayana in modern times.

Reception

Critical response 

B S Srivani from Deccan Herald wrote "Shekhar Chandra’s camerawork is A-One and Manikant Kadri’s music has a familiar feel to it, with a couple of songs burning the charts. Soundarrajan’s editing also helps make this film a complete entertainer, leaving very little to complain. This Maduve Mane is quite a welcoming place". A critic from News18 India wrote "What you might enjoy in the film is the comic exchange between Tabla Naani and Sharan. Cinematography and editing are noteworthy. Manikanth Kadri's music does nothing to lift the movie from its banality". A critic from Bangalore Mirror wrote  "Maduve Mane's story may look like three different films in one, but overall it keeps you engaged and could well be Singh's dream debut and Ganesh's second coming. Let good cinemas shower". A critic from Sify.com wrote "Manikanth Khadri`s songs are well composed. The sharp cuts by editor Soundar raise the tempo of the film. Maduve Mane is a neat, class presentation of a well written script".

Soundtrack

References

External links
 

2011 films
2010s Kannada-language films